Girls with Makarov, also known as Makarov and the Girls, is a Russian comedy television series produced by Comedy Club Productions. The main roles are played by Pavel Maykov, Alevtina Tukan, Vladislava Ermolaeva, Valeria Astapova and Elena Polyanskaya.

The series is about a tough police major Pavel Makarov who's in charge of the women's police division in Butovo. The show's title is a pun on the lead characters name and on the Makarov pistol.

The first season aired on TNT from March 9 to April 1, 2021. In the summer of 2021, new episodes were filmed for the second season. The second season premiered on January 31, 2022.

The series has been compared to Interns which was also made by the Comedy Club team, including director Radda Novikova.

Plot 
The head of the criminal investigation department in Butovo, police major Pavel Makarov, is sent four young graduates of the Academy of the Ministry of Internal Affairs. The newly minted lieutenants are very different both in appearance and in temperament: the ambitious brown-haired woman with honours Anna Turkina, the daring brunette Alexandra Popova, and the kind naïve single mother Olesya Verba, who thinks more about her three-year-old son than her work. At the same time, they all have one thing in common: with their inexperience, they greatly annoy their boss, who recently broke up with his beloved girlfriend (head of the Investigation Department, Olga Romanova). Despite Makarov's opposition, the young employees strive to prove that they are not in vain serving in the police.

Cast

Main roles

Minor roles

Series

Soundtrack

References 
 Perhaps crime: Review of the series "Girls with Makarov" // Film.ru , March 8, 2021
 "Girls with Makarov": Who is who in the series and in life // StarHit , March 9, 2021
 There are also women's positions in our police: Pavel Maykov in the comedy series "Girls with Makarov" // Komsomolskaya Pravda , March 9, 2021
 Interesting facts about the filming and actors of the series "Girls with Makarov" on TNT // Express newspaper , March 1, 2011
 New faces: Actresses of the TV series "Girls with Makarov" about women in the police and "service" in heels // " HELLO! Russia ": magazine, March 8, 2021

Links 
 

 Series page on the TNT channel website
 Series page on the Premier website

TNT (Russian TV channel) original programming
Russian television series
Russian television sitcoms
Russian crime television series
Russian workplace comedy television series
Russian police comedy television series
2020s police comedy television series
Russian police procedural television series
Fictional portrayals of the Moscow City Police